Vorn Vet (1929–1978) born Sok Thuok, was a Cambodian politician who served as deputy prime minister for the economy of Democratic Kampuchea. He was murdered at the S-21 security camp in 1978.

References 

1929 births
1978 deaths
Deputy Prime Ministers of Cambodia
Finance ministers of Cambodia 
Communist Party of Kampuchea politicians
People who died in the Cambodian genocide